Professor Shonku O El Dorado is a Bengali science fiction drama film directed by Sandip Ray based on Nakur Babu O El Dorado, a story of Satyajit Ray. Dhritiman Chatterjee portrayed the protagonist character of Professor Shonku. The film released theatrically on 20 December 2019.

Plot
This is an adventure story of the fictional genius scientist and inventor Professor Shonku visiting the heart of the Amazon forests in search of the mythical city of El Dorado. One day, a typical Bengali gentleman Nakur Chandra Biswas alias Nakur Babu comes to meet him in Shonku's house in Giridih. He lives in Makardaha. Shanku realises that Nakur Babu has supernatural power having the ability to read other's minds and see the future. Nakur Babu warns him about the upcoming incidents of São Paulo. Seeing his extrasensory power, an amazed Shonku goes to Brazil with Nakur Babu to join a science conference and the mystery begins ending in the fabled city of El Dorado deep inside the Brazilian Amazon

Cast
 Dhritiman Chatterjee as Professor Shonku
 Subhasish Mukhopadhyay as Nakur Chandra Biswas
 Eduardo Munniz as Lobo
 Jacqueline Mazarella as Professor Emilia Rodriguez
 Subhrajit Dutta as Samaresh
 Ricardo Dantas as Jeremy Saunders
 Roney Facchini as Wilhelm Krol
 Augusto Cesar as Hyter
 Meyerbeer Tapajós as Mike 
 Felipe Montanari as Bob
 Fernando Coelho as Solomon Bloomgarten
 Udayshankar Pal as Prahlad
 Ratan Sarkhel as Tarak

Reception
The Times of India gave the film 3 stars out of five and said, "Despite a perfect look and sharp glances, Dhritiman remains less convincing as Shonku. An indefinable stiffness engulfs his performance that questions the spontaneity of the character. Meanwhile, Subhashish too goes overboard with emotion as Nakurbabu. The film involves a lot of foreign actors and they deliver a decent performance. The overall CGI also appears to be a bit flimsy. 
In children’s literature, Shanku makes a clean sweep with his scientific masterstrokes. However, his on-screen journey starts with a bumpy ride. Let’s hope for a better future for him."

Firstpost gave the film 3 stars out  of five and said,"One of the distinguishing features of anything Satyajit Ray has ever written is the conciseness of it all. There is always something happening. Each page, each sentence is loaded with information, and often as the story progressed, a certain sense of urgency crept in. It is this sense of urgency that is missing in Sandip Ray’s screenplay."

The Indian Express Bangla gave the film  stars out of five.

References

External links
 

Indian children's films
Films based on Indian novels
Films directed by Sandip Ray
2010s science fiction adventure films
Indian science fiction adventure films
Bengali-language Indian films
2010s Bengali-language films
2019 films
Films set in Brazil